Rudra Pratap Sarangi  (1928-2013) was a leader of Bharatiya Janata Party from Jharkhand. He was a member of Lok Sabha from Jamshedpur elected in 1977 and 1980. Sarangi was a member of Bihar Vidhan Sabha from 1962 to 1976. He served as minister of State for Agriculture, Cooperation and Irrigation, Government of Bihar in 1967 to 1968. He was associated with Bharatiya Mazdoor Sangh. He was prominent leader of Vanachal state movement which demanded statehood for forest region for south Bihar.

References

1928 births
2013 deaths
India MPs 1977–1979
India MPs 1980–1984
People from Jamshedpur
Jharkhand politicians
Bihar MLAs 1962–1967
Bihar MLAs 1967–1969
Bihar MLAs 1972–1977
Bharatiya Janata Party politicians from Jharkhand
Janata Party (Secular) politicians